Manfred Krafft (11 December 1937 – 29 June 2022) was a German football player and manager.

References

1937 births
2022 deaths
German footballers
Footballers from Düsseldorf
Association football defenders
Bundesliga players
Fortuna Düsseldorf players
German football managers
Fortuna Düsseldorf managers
1. FC Saarbrücken managers
Karlsruher SC managers
SV Darmstadt 98 managers
1. FC Kaiserslautern managers
SG Union Solingen managers
Stuttgarter Kickers managers
1. FC Pforzheim managers